Alen Škoro (born 30 March 1981) is a Bosnian football manager and former professional player. At international level, he made four appearances for the Bosnia and Herzegovina national team. He was named manager of second tier Bosna Sema in June 2016.

Club career
Škoro came through the youth set up at FK Sarajevo. He joined French giants Olympique Marseille aged 20, but had to retire at 32 due to persistent knee injuries after a career which took him to Switzerland, Austria and Mexico. He played two matches for Klagenfurt in the Austrian Regionalliga in 2012 and his last club was Olimpik, whom he joined in summer 2012.

Only whilst playing in the Premier League of Bosnia and Herzegovina has Škoro ever been a prolific goal scorer and his spells in Ligue 1 and the Austrian Bundesliga were unsuccessful. He scored 63 goals in 111 games for Sarajevo.

International career
He made his debut for Bosnia and Herzegovina in an April 2004 friendly match against Finland and has earned a total of 4 caps, scoring no goals. His final international was a June 2009 friendly against Uzbekistan.

Career statistics

Club

International

Honours

Player
Sarajevo 
First League of Bosnia and Herzegovina: 1998–99

Individual
Bosnian Premier League top scorer: 2003–04 (20 goals)

References

External links
Profile - OM1899
 

Alen Škoro profile at Nogometni magazin 

1981 births
Living people
Footballers from Sarajevo
Association football forwards
Bosnia and Herzegovina footballers
Bosnia and Herzegovina international footballers
FK Sarajevo players
NK Olimpija Ljubljana (1945–2005) players
Olympique de Marseille players
Servette FC players
Grazer AK players
HNK Rijeka players
Querétaro F.C. footballers
FK Olimpik players
Premier League of Bosnia and Herzegovina players
Slovenian PrvaLiga players
Ligue 1 players
Swiss Super League players
Austrian Football Bundesliga players
Croatian Football League players
Liga MX players
Austrian Regionalliga players
Bosnia and Herzegovina expatriate footballers
Expatriate footballers in Slovenia
Bosnia and Herzegovina expatriate sportspeople in Slovenia
Expatriate footballers in France
Bosnia and Herzegovina expatriate sportspeople in France
Expatriate footballers in Switzerland
Bosnia and Herzegovina expatriate sportspeople in Switzerland
Expatriate footballers in Austria
Bosnia and Herzegovina expatriate sportspeople in Austria
Expatriate footballers in Croatia
Bosnia and Herzegovina expatriate sportspeople in Croatia
Expatriate footballers in Mexico
Bosnia and Herzegovina expatriate sportspeople in Mexico